Fitz and the Tantrums is the third studio album by American indie pop and neo soul group Fitz and the Tantrums, released on June 10, 2016 by Elektra Records.

Critical reception

Fitz and the Tantrums received mixed reviews from critics. At Metacritic, which assigns a normalized rating out of 100 to reviews from mainstream publications, the album received an average score of 56, which indicates "mixed or average reviews" based on 7 reviews. Isaac Feldberg from the Boston Globe calls it the band's "glossiest record yet", with a "brassy, retro-glam aesthetic with a commercial-minded agenda", going on to say, "on ballads (...) the band sounds more lost, mired in lackluster lyrics and mundane melodies." The 405 gave it a score of 20/100 and wrote, "Each and every track on this album is so jam-packed with garbage pop flourishes that it can get exhausting."

Track listing

Personnel
Adapted from AllMusic.

Fitz and the Tantrums
Michael Fitzpatrick – vocals, engineering
Noelle Scaggs – vocals, tambourine
James King – saxophone
Joseph Karnes – bass guitar, engineering
Jeremy Ruzumna – keyboards
John Wicks – drums, percussion, engineering

Additional musicians
Steve Bays – keyboards, vocals
Parker Bossley – guitar, vocals
Sean Foreman –  vocals
Ross Golan – vocals
Fran Hall – vocals
Jordan Katz – piccolo trumpet, trombone, trumpet
Grant Michaels – drum programming, acoustic guitar, keyboards
Ricky Reed – bass, guitar, keyboards, producer, programming

Artwork
Joseph Cultice – photography
Doug Gledhill – art direction, design
Ryan McCann – art direction, design
Sam Riback – A&R
Craig Kallman – A&R
Jeff Nicholas – design, layout

Production
Miles Comaskey – mixing assistant
Robin Florent – mixing assistant
Chris Galland – mixing assistant, mixing engineer
Ryan Gilligan – engineer
Aaron Glas – engineer
Jeff Jackson – mixing assistant
Joel Little – composer, engineer, producer
Michelle Mancini – mastering
Manny Marroquin – mixing
Tony Maserati – mixing
Ryan "Shmedly" Maynes – engineer
Ike Schultz – mixing assistant
David Schwerkolt – assistant engineer
Tyler Scott – mixing assistant

Charts

Certifications

References 

2016 albums
Fitz and The Tantrums albums
Elektra Records albums
Albums produced by Joel Little
Pop rock albums by American artists